Waunfawr is a station on the narrow gauge Welsh Highland Railway, which was built in 1877 as the North Wales Narrow Gauge Railways Moel Tryfan Undertaking, to carry dressed slate to Dinas Junction on the London and North Western Railway. Passenger services ceased on 26 September 1936 and the station was reopened on 7 August 2000 following the reconstruction of the railway from Dinas to Waunfawr. The train services are operated by the Festiniog Railway Company.

"Waunfawr" is Welsh for "Big Heath".

In 2000, in order to remodel the layout of the station, the old building was carefully taken down. Although carefully dismantled by the WH Heritage Group, the numbered and stored stone was inadvertently used as fill for the embankments, or to build a stone wall, by the contractor.

Following reconstruction, the section from Waunfawr to Rhyd Ddu was formally reopened by the Prince of Wales on 30 July 2003. Prince Charles travelled from Waunfawr to Rhyd Ddu by special train.

The station flower and shrub beds were laid out and are maintained by the local community enterprise charity, Antur Waunfawr.
The Snowdonia Park Hotel adjoins the station and was built originally as the station master's house.
Entrance to and exit from the station platform is by way of the hotel car park. The station footbridge links with a car park and a caravan park. Snowdonia Sherpa Bus services call at the station.

In 2018–19, after a substantial donation, the station building was rebuilt in the style of the original NWNG building of 1877, but to modern building standards.

References

External links
The Welsh Highland Railway Project - official reconstruction site
Welsh Highland Railway (Caernarfon)
Rebuilding The Welsh Highland Railway - an independent site
The Royal re-opening to Rhyd Ddu 2003
Welsh Highland Railway Timetables
Multimap Map of Waunfawr
Festipedia
Plans to reconstruct the NWNGR Waunfawr station building

Heritage railway stations in Gwynedd
Welsh Highland Railway
Betws Garmon
Railway stations in Great Britain opened in 1877
Railway stations in Great Britain closed in 1936
Railway stations in Great Britain opened in 2000